Brit is a fictional superhero in the Image Universe. He first appeared in Brit (July 2003), and was created by Robert Kirkman and Tony Moore.

Publication history
Brit starred in three one-shots: Brit (July 2003), Brit: Cold Death (December 2003), Brit: Red, White, Black and Blue (August 2004). Robert Kirkman wrote the three one-shots with Tony Moore illustrating the first and second issue and with Cliff Rathburn on the third. The one-shots have been collected in a trade paperback and was released in March 2007.

In August 2007, Brit was launched as an ongoing, full-color series written by Bruce Brown and features Rathburn's debut as an ongoing series artist. The series was overseen and edited by Kirkman. As of the second issue, Andy Kuhn came aboard as the series' breakdown artist. In the seventh issue, Rathburn was replaced by Nate Bellegarde as the new artist. The series expanded Brit's universe by introducing his brother and Sister and also revealed the origin of his powers.

The series was brought to a close with issue #12, because, according to Kirkman, "the book sells a fraction of what Invincible, The Walking Dead and The Astounding Wolf-Man sell. But I could have kept it going. I blame a horrendous shipping schedule for the low sales... something that I must shoulder the bulk of the blame for".

Brit became the first member of the newly reformed Guardians of the Globe in a six issue mini-series starting in August 2010.

Supporting cast
Jessica: Brit's wife. Former law student turned stripper at club owned by Brit.
Brittany, Jr.: Brit's infant son.
Britney: Brit's younger half-sister
Cecil Stedman: Head of the clandestine Global Defense Agency.
Donald Ferguson: Superhuman liaison of the Global Defense Agency, Brit's contact, and android.
Steven Erickson: Former Deputy Director of the Global Defense Agency and Brit's former boss.
Slitter: Interim Deputy Director of the Global Defense Agency and Brit's new superior.
Euclid: Brit's younger brother and nemesis.

Collected editions
The comics have been collected into trade paperback:
 Brit:
 Volume 1: Old Soldier (collects "Brit", "Brit: Cold Death" and "Brit: Red, White, Black and Blue", 176 pages, March 2007)
 Volume 2: AWOL (collects Brit #1-6, 144 pages, August 2008)
 Volume 3: Fubar (collects Brit #7-12, August 2009)

References

External links 
Official Brit Website
Review of Brit #1, Comics Bulletin

2003 comics debuts
Comics characters introduced in 2003
Skybound Entertainment titles
Characters created by Robert Kirkman
Comics by Robert Kirkman
Image Comics characters with superhuman strength
Image Comics male superheroes
Skybound Entertainment superheroes